Barangaroo railway station is a future underground rapid transit station for the inner-city Barangaroo precinct in Sydney, Australia. The proposal, announced in 2015, forms part of Transport for NSW's Sydney Metro City & Southwest scheme and would make Barangaroo the first stop for southbound metro trains in the central business district (CBD).

While plans for a harbour rail tunnel have been government policy for more than a decade, neither the 2005 Metropolitan Rail Expansion (MREP) and 2012 Sydney's Rail Future strategies envisaged the new line stopping at Barangaroo. The various metro rail proposals of 2008–10, which involved lines running west from the CBD towards Rozelle and the northern suburbs, would have included a station between Wynyard and Barangaroo. These proposals were shelved in 2010, however. The government also considered a light rail line from Central to Barangaroo via Sussex Street and Hickson Road, but nothing came of this proposal.

With the first buildings at Barangaroo opening in 2015 and no mass transit construction imminent, Transport for NSW instead began work on the Wynyard Walk: a pedestrian tunnel to connect Wynyard station and the new precinct. The walkway was opened in September 2016.

In 2015, Premier Mike Baird announced the government's intention to divert the second harbour rail crossing via Barangaroo to allow a station to be built there. On 10 November 2018 NSW Transport announced that a 180-year-old timber boat was met with during excavation works for the Metro station, regarded as 'the oldest boat of its kind ever found in NSW'.  Wood samples revealed it is made from Sydney Blue Gum, Stringybark and Spotted Gum.

Starting from October 2019, excavation and tunnelling work has begun at the Barangaroo station precinct and under the Sydney Harbour. This station is scheduled to open in 2024, as part of the Sydney Metro City & Southwest.

References

External links

Barangaroo Station Sydney Metro

Proposed railway stations in Sydney

Railway stations scheduled to open in 2024